Major-General Sir Thomas Dennehy  (1829–1915), born in County Cork, Ireland and educated in Paris, was an administrator in British India.

Dennehy served in the suppression of Sonthal rebellion in 1855–56 and during the Indian Rebellion. He was Political Agent in Dholpur in 1879–85. He was extra Groom in Waiting to Queen Victoria in 1888 and to her successor King Edward VII from 1901.

By 1892, Dennehy had a residence in Ireland, at Brooklodge, Fermoy, Co. Cork.
In January 1896, he was made a Knight Commander of the Most Eminent Order of the Indian Empire (KCIE).

References

1829 births
1915 deaths
British Indian Army generals
British military personnel of the Indian Rebellion of 1857
Irish knights
Administrators in British India
Knights Commander of the Order of the Indian Empire
People from County Cork